The Greene County Public Schools system is a branch of the Greene County, Virginia county government, and administers public schools in the  localities of Greene County and the city of Stanardsville. The superintendent of schools is Dr. Andrea Whitmarsh.

School Board Members
The school board is made up of six members:
Dr. Andrea Whitmarsh - Superintendent
Mr. Todd Sansom - Chairman - Monroe District
Ms. Sharon Mack - Vice-Chair - Ruckersville District
Ms. Becky Roach - Stanardsville District
Mr. Jason Tooley - At-Large
Mr. Brooks Taylor - Midway District

Schools

High school
William Monroe High School (Grades: 9-12)

Middle school
William Monroe Middle School (Grades: 6-8)

Elementary schools
Nathanael Greene Elementary School (Grades: 3-5)
Ruckersville Elementary School (Grades: K-5)

Primary school
Nathanael Greene Primary School (Grades K-2)

See also
List of school districts in Virginia

External links
Greene County Public Schools

School divisions in Virginia
Education in Greene County, Virginia